Thomas Alexander Mitchell (1812 – 16 March 1875) was an English Liberal politician who sat in the House of Commons from 1841 to 1875.

Mitchell was a merchant in the City of London. He was a partner in the firm of Mitchell, Yeames and Co, a member of the committee of management of Lloyds Shipping Register and chairman of the Chartered Bank of India, Australia and China.

At the 1841 general election, Mitchell was elected as one of the two Members of Parliament (MPs) for Bridport.
He held the seat until his death 1875, aged 63.

References

External links
 

1812 births
1875 deaths
Liberal Party (UK) MPs for English constituencies
UK MPs 1841–1847
UK MPs 1847–1852
UK MPs 1852–1857
UK MPs 1857–1859
UK MPs 1859–1865
UK MPs 1865–1868
UK MPs 1868–1874
UK MPs 1874–1880